Renfe Feve is a division of state-owned Spanish railway company Renfe Operadora. It operates most of Spain's  of  railway. This division of Renfe was previously a stand-alone company named FEVE (Ferrocarriles de Vía Estrecha, Spanish for "Narrow-gauge railways"). On 31 December 2012, the Spanish government simplified the organization of train companies merging Feve into Renfe and Adif. The rolling stock and the brand FEVE was transferred to Renfe (renamed to "Renfe Feve") and the infrastructures were transferred to Adif.

History

FEVE was created in 1965, as a successor to the government-run organisation EFE (Explotación de Ferrocarriles por el Estado), which was created by the Miguel Primo de Rivera administration in 1926 to take over failed private railways. Following the creation of Renfe in 1941, to which the ownership of all Spanish broad-gauge railways were transferred to, EFE had in practice become the operator of a collection of exclusively narrow-gauge lines. The present status of FEVE, as a government-owned commercial company, dates from 1965.

The new company continued to absorb independent railway lines (& ),  where the existing concession holders had been unable to be profitable. However, from 1978 onwards, with the introduction of regional devolution under the new Spanish constitution, FEVE also began transferring responsibility for a number of its operations to the new regional governments. This happened in Catalonia (FGC) in 1979, in a portion of the Basque (Euskotren) network in 1982, in the Valencian Community (FGV) in 1986, and with the Majorcan Railways (SFM) in 1994. That did not however occur in the Region of Murcia, where the narrow-gauge railway network remained under FEVE control. The above-mentioned EFE (Explotación de Ferrocarriles por el Estado) also operated the Carabanchel – Chamartín de la Rosa suburbano railway in the city of Madrid. That railway became part of the Madrid Metro when control of that line was transferred to the Community of Madrid in the early-1980s, later integrated as the present-day Line 10.

On 31 December 2012, the company disappeared due to the merger of the narrow gauge network FEVE and the broad gauge network RENFE. The infrastructure was transferred to Adif and the rolling stock was transferred to Renfe Operadora. The operation of the narrow gauge network continued under the same conditions after the reorganization.

FEVE network
The great majority of the narrow-gauge lines that were operated by FEVE before it disappeared were located along or near Spain's Atlantic Ocean and Bay of Biscay coastline, which stretches from Galicia in the northwest, through Asturias and Cantabria to the Basque Country (with a branch extending into Castile and León). Together they formed a large and strategically important system, which was why – unlike the other, more isolated regional railways – they have been retained under the integrated management of FEVE.

Transcantábrico line
Operated as a holiday service, the carriages of the train are furnished with bedrooms, lounges and restaurants and voyages typically last eight days and seven nights.

FEVE also operated "normal" regional (express and stopping) services (in sections) from Ferrol to Hendaye (some sections operated now by regional operators). One of the longest regular (non-tourist) FEVE service operated between Leon and Bilbao (a journey of some 7 hours).

Commuter services
FEVE also operated a range of cercanías or commuter services. The main commuter area is Cercanías Asturias, where the dense five-line FEVE network was totally integrated with the RENFE lines and works effectively as a regional metro system.

The Bilbao area has a line running from Bilbao's Concordia station to the large town of Balmaseda, calling at local villages and settlements on its way through Biscay, as well as the main towns of Basurto, Sodupe, Aranguren, and Zalla.

Two commuter lines begin at Santander railway station and terminate at Liérganes and Cabezón de la Sal.

In southern Spain, Renfe Feve operates the historic Cartagena-Los Nietos Line.

Goods operations

FEVE's rails transported approximately 460 million tonnes  of goods each year, accounting for a large part of the company's business. The products one may expect to see on board their goods trains include iron, steel and coal, fueling much of the country's industry.

Companies operating former FEVE services
 Euskotren and Metro Bilbao - in the Basque Country (there is a connecting line between the FEVE and EuskoTren networks in Bilbao)
 FGC - around Barcelona
 FGV - in the Valencian Community
 SFM - on the island of Majorca
 Metro de Madrid - in the city of Madrid.

See also
 Transport in Spain
 History of rail transport in Spain
 Narrow gauge railways in Portugal

References

External links

 RENFE FEVE website (Spanish)
 Transcantábrico website (English)

Railway companies of Spain
Regional rail in Spain
Metre gauge railways in Spain
Renfe
1965 establishments in Spain